John Montgomery (died 1733) was an Irish M.P. for County Monaghan, Ireland.

He was the second son of Colonel Alexander Montgomery (1667–1722) M.P. for County Monaghan, of Ballyleck, County Monaghan and Elizabeth Cole, daughter of Colonel Thomas Cole of Mount Florence, County Fermanagh. He succeeded his father to the Ballyleck Estate when his elder brother Thomas Montgomery (Irish politician) was disinherited for marrying an Englishwoman.

He commanded a regiment of horse under the Duke of Marlborough. He was elected M.P. for County Monaghan, Ireland and sat from November 1727 to August 1733. He was appointed High Sheriff of Monaghan for 1726.

He married Mary Coxe, a Maid of Honour to Queen Caroline, wife of King George II of Great Britain. Mary Coxe's father was also the Queen's physician and governor of New Jersey, Dr Daniel Coxe.

Montgomery's sons were:
John Montgomery (died 1741) 
General Alexander Montgomery (died 1785), (both were M.P.'s for County Monaghan)

His nephew was the American Revolution war-hero Major-General Richard Montgomery.

After Col. John Montgomery's death his wife married William Clement LL.D. Vice Provost of Trinity College, Dublin and M.P. both for the College and the City of Dublin. She died at Beaulieu, Co. Louth in 1790, aged 97 years.

References

Irish MPs 1727–1760
1733 deaths
Politicians from County Monaghan
Year of birth unknown
High Sheriffs of Monaghan
Members of the Parliament of Ireland (pre-1801) for County Monaghan constituencies
Clan Montgomery
British Army officers